The 1995 Northwest Territories general election was held on October 16, 1995. This was the last election before the Northwest Territories was split in two with the creation of Nunavut.

The big issue this election was the division of the Northwest Territories assets to meet the April 1, 1999 deadline. Twenty four MLAs were elected, seven incumbents returned and one was acclaimed.

Election Results

The election was held in 24 constituencies with 24,568 ballots cast, a turnout of 75.43%.

Outgoing Premier Nellie Cournoyea did not run for re-election. She was replaced first by Don Morin, who resigned in November 1998 over conflict of interest allegations. Morin was replaced by an interim Premier, Goo Arlooktoo until December 1998, before Jim Antoine filled out the remainder of the term.

Election summary

Candidates

External links
CBC Clip profiling the 1995 election

1995 elections in Canada
Elections in the Northwest Territories
October 1995 events in Canada
1995 in the Northwest Territories